"Natchez" is an American television play broadcast live on May 29, 1958, as part of the second season of the CBS television series Playhouse 90. Martin M. Goldsmith wrote the teleplay based on a story by E.A. Ellington. David Lowell Rich directed. Cliff Robertson, Macdonald Carey, and Thomas Mitchell starred.

Plot
A Confederate prisoner of war returns to Mississippi after the end of the American Civil War. His father is viewed as a traitor because he did not participate in scorched-earth practices. The former POW falls in love with the wife of a man who operates a Mississippi River gambling boat.

Cast
The following performers received screen credit for their performances:

 Cliff Robertson - Danny Carson
 Macdonald Carey - Alexander Lamar
 Thomas Mitchell - Mr. Carson
 Felicia Farr - Valerie Lamar
 Ted de Corsia - Jenkins
 Dan Blocker
 Chubby Johnson
 Keith Vincent

Production
William Froug was the producer, and David Lowell Rich directed.  Martin M. Goldsmith wrote the teleplay based on a story by E.A. Ellington. The production was broadcast on May 29, 1958. It was part of the second season of Playhouse 90, an anthology television series that was voted "the greatest television series of all time" in a 1970 poll of television editors.

References

1958 television plays
1958 American television episodes
Playhouse 90 (season 2) episodes